Marthaguy Shire was a local government area in the Orana region of New South Wales, Australia.

Marthaguy Shire was proclaimed on 7 March 1906, one of 134 shires created after the passing of the Local Government (Shires) Act 1905. 

The shire office was in Warren.  Towns and villages in the shire included Collie and Nevertire.

Marthaguy Shire amalgamated with the Municipality of Warren to form Warren Shire on 1 January 1957.

References

Former local government areas of New South Wales
1906 establishments in Australia
1957 disestablishments in Australia